The following is a list of concept vehicles by Japanese carmaker Daihatsu, a subsidiary of Toyota Motor Corporation.

 A-Concept (2011)
 ai (2003)
 Akindo (1997)
 AS-2 (1999)
 Ayla GT (2013)
 Ayla GT2 (2014)
 Ayla Luxury (2013)
 Ayla Turbo (2018)
 Ayla X-Track (2013)
 Basket (2009)
 BC7 (1989)
 BCX (1971)
 BCX-5 (1985)
 BCX-II (1972)
 BCX-III (1973)
 BCX-M (1979)
 Be-go (2005)
 Copen Adventure (2016)
 Copen Cero Coupe (2016)
 Copen Robe Shooting Brake (2016)
 Copen SARD Special (2003)
 Costa (2005)
 CUV (2013)
 CUV2 (2014)
 D-bag4 (1993)
 D-Base (2015)
 D-Bone (2003)
 D-Compact 4x4 (2005)
 D-Concept X-Over (2006)
 D-R (2012)
 D-R Estate (2013)
 D-X (2011)
 Dash 21 (1993)
 Deca Deca (2009)
 DN Compagno (2017)
 DN F-Sedan (2017)
 DN Multisix (2017)
 DN Pro Cargo (2017)
 DN Trec (2017)
 DN U-Space (2017)
 e:S (2009)
 E3 (2003)
 Esse (2005)
 EV1 (1973)
 EZ-U (1999)
 FC Deck (2013)
 Sho Case (2012)
 Fellow X90 (1989)
 FF Ultra Space (2001)
 FR-X (1997)
 FFC (2004)
 FRC (2004)
 FT (2015)
 FX (2015)
 FX-21 (1995)
 FX-228 (1991)
 Hijetdumbo (1989)
 Hinata (2015)
 HSC (2007)
 HVS (2005)
 HY Fun (2019)
 IcoIco (2019)
 Kopen Future Included RM1 (2014)
 Kopen Future Included RM2 (2014)
 Kopen Future Included RM3 (2014)
 Kopen Future Included RMX (2013)
 Kopen Future Included RMZ (2013)
 Micros-3L (1999)
 Midget II (1993)
 Midget III (1995)
 Mira Milano (1991)
 Move FCV K-2 (2003)
 MP4 (1995)
 MS-X90 (1989)
 MS-X94 (1994)
 MS-X97 (1997)
 Daihatsu Mud Master-C (2007)
 Muse (2001)
 Naked X070 (1997)
 Marienkafer (1990)
 Mira PM/L (1987)
 NC-Y (2013)
 NC-Z (2013)
 NCX (1997)
 Noriori (2015)
 OFC-1 (2007)
 Personal Coupe (1993)
 PICO (2011)
 RA-90 (1989)
 RA-91 (1991)
 Rocky California Heart (1991)
 Sirion Sport (2006)
 SK-Tourer (2005)
 Sneaker (1989)
 SP-4 (1999)
 Sport (1966)
 SUV (2014)
 TA-X80 (1987)
 Taft Concept (2020)
 Tanto FCHV (2005)
 TEC-1 (1989)
 Tempo (2015)
 Terios Sport
 Town Cube (1995)
 Trek (1985)
 TsumuTsumu (2019)
 U4B (2001)
 UF Mini-S (2002)
 UF Mini-V (2002)
 UFC (2012)
 UFC2 (2013)
 UFC3 (2014)
 UFE-I (2001)
 UFE-II (2003)
 UFE-III (2005)
 Ultramini (1993)
 Urban Buggy (1987)
 WaiWai (2019)
 WakuWaku (2019)
 X-021 (1991)
 X-409 (1991)
 X-1 (1995)
 Xenia Sport (2019)
 XL-C (2003)

References 

Daihatsu
Daihatsu concept vehicles